Master of Wine (MW) is a qualification (not an academic degree) issued by The Institute of Masters of Wine in the United Kingdom. The MW qualification is generally regarded in the wine industry as one of the highest standards of professional knowledge.

The Institute was founded in 1955, and the MW examinations were first arranged in 1953 by the Worshipful Company of Vintners and the Wine and Spirits Association.

Qualification
Before enrolling in the MW study programme, prospective students must hold an advanced wine qualification, at least Diploma level from the Wine & Spirit Education Trust, or an appropriately high level sommelier certificate, such as Advanced Sommelier from the Court of Master Sommeliers. Also, prospective students need to have a minimum of three years' professional work experience in the global wine community. Applicants must submit a basic essay, a tasting paper, a brief statement explaining their interest in becoming a Master of Wine, and a reference to support their application, from a Master of Wine or another senior wine trade professional.

The study programme is made up of three stages. Stage 1 is the foundation year and gives students the opportunity to meet Masters of Wine and fellow students in both professional and social settings. Stage 1 assessment includes six pieces of work evaluated during the year, culminating in an exam that takes place in early June. The exam involves one tasting paper and two essays. Stage 2 is a crucial time for students and can be very intense. Students must provide three pieces of work for assessment during the Stage 2 year, and must pass both the Theory and Practical parts of the June MW Examination. Stage 3 consists of writing a sole-authorship research paper of between 6,000 and 10,000 words in length on a topic of the student's choice. The qualification process takes at least three years to complete.

Membership
Until 1983, the examination was limited to United Kingdom wine importers, merchants and retailers. The first non-UK Master of Wine was awarded in 1988.  As of March 2021, there are 416 MWs in the world, living in 31 countries. The MWs are spread across 5 continents, wherein the UK has 208 MWs, US has 45 MWs, Australia has 24 MWs and France has 16 MWs. There are 9 countries with 1 MW each on the list. 

Today, members hold a range of occupations including winemakers, viticulturists, winemaking consultants, wine writers and journalists, wine educators, and wine service, restaurant and hotel management.  In addition, many are involved in the purchasing, importing, distribution, sales and marketing of wine.

Notable Masters of Wine

Notable Masters of Wine include:

 Tim Atkin
 Gerard Basset
 Nicolas Belfrage
 Julian Brind
 Michael Broadbent
 Clive Coates
 Mary Ewing-Mulligan
 Doug Frost
 Ned Goodwin
 Anthony Hanson
 Benjamin Lewin
 Brian McGrath
 Debra Meiburg
 Jasper Morris
 Michael Palij 
 Jonathan Pedley
 David Peppercorn
 Lisa Perrotti-Brown
 Jancis Robinson
 Arne Ronold
 Serena Sutcliffe
 Sonal Holland

See also
 List of wine personalities
 Court of Master Sommeliers
Wine & Spirit Education Trust

References

External links
 The Institute of Masters of Wine

Education in the London Borough of Wandsworth
Educational qualifications in the United Kingdom
Hospitality industry in the United Kingdom
 
Professional titles and certifications
Wine terminology